The 2012–13 Football League Two (referred to as the Npower Football League Two for sponsorship reasons) was the ninth season of the league under its current title and twentieth season under its current league division format. It started on 18 August 2012 and finished on 27 April 2013 with all matches that day kicking off simultaneously.

Changes from last season

Team changes

From League Two
Promoted to League One
 Swindon Town
 Shrewsbury Town
 Crawley Town
 Crewe Alexandra

Relegated to Conference National
 Hereford United
 Macclesfield Town

To League Two
Relegated from League One
 Wycombe Wanderers
 Chesterfield
 Exeter City
 Rochdale

Promoted from Conference National
 Fleetwood Town
 York City

Team overview

Stadia and locations
''Note: Table shows mathematically qualified teams as of 28 April 2012 in alphabetical order.

Personnel and sponsoring

Managerial changes

League table
Twenty-four teams contest the division: 18 sides remaining in the division from last season, four relegated from League One, and two promoted from Conference National.

Play-offs

Results

Season statistics

Top scorers

Assists

Hat-tricks

 4 Player scored 4 goals

Scoring
First goal of the season: Troy Brown for Aldershot Town against Plymouth Argyle (18 August 2012)
Fastest goal of the season: 14 seconds, Sam Morsy for Port Vale against Morecambe (25 August 2012)
Latest goal of the season: 94 minutes and 17 seconds, Jason Walker for York City against Chesterfield (8 September 2012) and Oliver Norburn for Bristol Rovers against Cheltenham Town (5 February 2013)
Largest winning margin: 6 goals
Port Vale 7–1 Burton Albion (5 April 2013)

Most league wins
Rotherham United 24

Clean sheets
Most clean sheets: 13
Fleetwood Town
Fewest clean sheets: 6
AFC Wimbledon

Discipline
Most yellow cards (club): 44
Fleetwood Town
Most yellow cards (player): 7
 Tom Parkes (Bristol Rovers)
 Kevin Ellison (Morecambe)
 Josh Scowen (Wycombe Wanderers)
 Junior Brown (Fleetwood Town)
 Rene Howe (Torquay United)
Most red cards (club): 6
Bristol Rovers
Most red cards (player): 2
 Edgar Davids (Barnet)

Monthly awards

References

 
EFL League Two seasons
3
4
Eng